Top Chef Suomi is a Finnish cooking reality show on Sub based on the American television series Top Chef. Auditions for the series were held in autumn 2010 and 12 contestants were chosen. The programme is hosted by model and restaurant chef Pipsa Hurmerinta  The head judge for the competition is Finland's most renowned chef Hans Välimäki. The other judge is business group manager of Royal Ravintolat Pia Kämppi. Top Chef season 5 runner up Stefan Richter has made an appearance as a special guest judge for the first four episodes. The show is produced by Solar Television Oy. The show is renewed for a second season, which is expected to premiere in either fall 2011 or in spring 2012.

The winner of Top Chef Suomi Akseli Herlevi received a culinary travel grant to top restaurants worldwide worth €10,000, a contract for a cookbook with the publishing company Tammi, a Samsung flatscreen TV and home entertainment system worth €8,000.

Contestants
12 chefs competed in the first season. Names, ages, and hometowns below are from the Sub website. In elimination order, the contestants were:
Mic Vettenranta 33 — Resides in: Helsinki
Bianca McKell 32 — Resides in: Helsinki
Jussi Raunio 22 — Resides in: Espoo
Ulla Liukkonen 54 — Resides in: Lappeenranta
Jani Pajala 34 — Resides in: Helsinki
Arto Lappalainen 23 — Resides in: Tampere
Markus Kauppinen 28 — Resides in: Helsinki
Maija Silvennoinen 49 — Resides in: Kangasala
Annina Roiha 22 — Resides in: Simpele/Helsinki
Mika Jokela 40 — Resides in: Turenki
Samu Koskinen 39 — Resides in: Helsinki
Akseli Herlevi 24 — Resides in: Hyvinkää

Contestant progress

 (WINNER) The chef won the season and was crowned Top Chef.
 (RUNNER-UP) The chef was a runner-up for the season.
 (WIN) The chef won that episode's Elimination Challenge.
 (HIGH) The chef was selected as one of the top entries in the Elimination Challenge, but did not win.
 (LOW) The chef was selected as one of the bottom entries in the Elimination Challenge, but was not eliminated.
 (OUT) The chef lost that week's Elimination Challenge and was out of the competition.
 (IN) The chef neither won nor lost that week's Elimination Challenge. They also were not up to be eliminated.
 IN (+) The chef won a pair or team challenge but was not chosen as one of the judges' favorites.
 IN (-) The chef lost a pair or team challenge but was not selected as one of the judges' least favorites.

: Each entire team was called in for judging, thus there were no top or bottom individual team members.
: There was no Quickfire Challenge in this episode.
: Team Ravintola M.M.M. won the challenge, thus there was no one individual winner.

Episodes
Each episode includes two challenges. The Tulikoe or Quickfire Challenge is a short, simple challenge with a varying reward each week; in the initial episodes of the season, it usually guarantees the winner immunity from being sent home that week. The Pudotushaaste or Elimination Challenge is a more complex challenge that determines who goes home. One or more guest judges join the show each week to evaluate both the Quickfire and Elimination challenges. Each week's elimination is announced in a segment called "Judges' Table."

Episode 1: Who's Who? (Kuka on kuka?)
Quickfire Challenge: The contestants are asked to make an amuse bouche using only the food items and utensils at the buffet table for their welcome party
Top: Arto, Samu, Maija
Bottom: Aninna, Mic, Ulla
WINNER: Arto (Hot smoked salmon, Parma Ham and Fish Roe on toasted rye bread)
Elimination Challenge: The contestants were asked in advance to say what their favourite ingredient to work with is and they must now show why.
At Judges' Table, Annina, Samu and Maija were selected as the judges' favorites
At Judges' Table, Mic, Jussi and Jani were selected as the judges' least favorites
 WINNER: Annina (Pan Roasted Pike-Perch, Lentils, Jerusalem Artichoke Purée with a Beurre Blanc)
 ELIMINATED: Mic (Duck Breast Two Ways, Traditional and in a Pyttipannu)
Guest Judges: Stefan Richter
First aired 26 January 2011

Episode 2: Storm in the Aquarium (Myrsky akvaariossa)
Quickfire Challenge: Each chef receives a whole pike and must fillet it and prepare a dish in 45min.
Top: Akseli, Mika, Jussi
Bottom: Bianca, Samu, Maija
WINNER: Akseli (Butter Poached Pike, Potato Purée with Fish Roe Smetana)
Elimination Challenge: In the Top Chef kitchen, the chefs must prepare a seafood dish in 1 hour.
At Judges' Table, Samu, Jani, Mika were selected as the judges' favorites
At Judges' Table, Maija, Bianca, Markus were selected as the judges' least favorites
 WINNER: Samu (Soy Glazed Norway Lobster, Sea Urchin Roe with a Sake Sauce)
 ELIMINATED: Bianca (Roasted Red Pepper and King Crab Risotto with Shrimp Ceviche Crostini)
Guest Judges: Stefan Richter
First aired 2 February 2011

Episode 3: Making Headlines (Etusivu uusiksi)
Quickfire Challenge: The chefs are given 45 minutes to prepare a dessert using chocolate as the main ingredient.
Top: Akseli, Samu, Maija
Bottom: Annina, Markus, Jani 
WINNER: Maija (Chocolate Marquise and Pistachio Creme)
Elimination Challenge: The chefs in a team challenge must prepare a buffet table for a Sub press conference with 200 guests taking ecology and ethics into account. Each team receives €900 and 2 hours prep time. As quickfire winner, Maija gets to choose her team members.
Blue Team
Maija: Baltic Herring Poached in Allspice Flavoured Broth; Vispipuuro with a Vanilla Sauce and Oatmeal Cookie
Jussi: Honey and Rosemary Glazed Root Vegetables with Horseradish Crème
Mika: Mushroom Mousse on Crispbread
Samu: Jellied Whitefish Tartare
Arto: Rillette of Pork Neck with Red Onion Jam
Red Team:
Annina: Pea Soup Shot; Cold Smoked Reindeer Tartare
Akseli: Cold Smoked Salmon Mousse, on Caramalised Rustic Bread and "Granny's Cucumber"; Blueberry Pie
Markus: Perch Croquette, Fennel Salad with Herb Mayonnaise
Jani: Filet of Beef, Mushroom Salad and Smoked Celery Purée
Ulla: Potato Bread "Lepuska" filled with Spinach
At Judges' Table, the Red Team was selected as the judges' favorite team
At Judges' Table, the Blue Team was selected as the judges' least favorite team
 WINNER: Markus
 ELIMINATED: Jussi
Guest Judges: Stefan Richter
First aired 9 February 2011

Episode 4: Shake, Cattle and Roll (Rockia ja rotukarjaa)
Quickfire Challenge: Each chef must prepare a fast food dish in 45min.
Top: Mika, Akseli, Samu
Bottom: Ulla, Arto, Annina
WINNER: Samu (Bunless Duck Liver Burger with Truffle Cole Slaw)
Elimination Challenge: The chefs must prepare a dish from Finnish domestic livestock. As Quickfire winner, Samu chooses lamb neck. The rest of the chefs draw knives to assign meats.
Annina: Rack of Pork
Maija: Beef Flank
Jani: Pork Flank
Ulla: Sirloin of Beef
Akseli: Rack of Lamb
Markus: Lamb Shank
Arto: Pork Shank
Mika: Lamb Shoulder
At Judges' Table, Jani, Akseli, Arto were selected as the judges' favorites
At Judges' Table, Ulla, Maija, Mika were selected as the judges' least favorites
 WINNER: Akseli (Rack of Lamb with Paprika Bulgur, Garlic Purée and Coffee Sauce)
 ELIMINATED: Ulla (Roasted Sirloin, Mushroom and Potato Croquette with Red Wine Sauce)
Guest Judges: Maija Vilkkumaa, Mikko Koskonen, Stefan Richter
Original Airdate: 16 February 2011

Episode 5: Hungry Athletes (Nälkäiset urheilijat)
Quickfire Challenge: The chefs must pair a dish with a beer appropriate for a gastropub in 45 minutes, The chefs draw knives to decide which beer goes to whom:
Akseli: Krušovické černé
Annina: Newcastle Brown Ale
Markus: Murphy's Strout
Maija: Gourmet Vaalea
Jani: Gourmet Tumma
Mika: Sol
Arto: Affligem
Samu: Eidelweiss
Top: Mika, Jani, Maija
Bottom: Akseli, Markus, Samu
WINNER: Mika (Garlic Soup, Shrimp Ceviche and "Chili Tacos")
Elimination Challenge: Prepare lunch for the hockey team Jokerit at Hartwall Arena before a match. The meal must be rich in carbohydrates and protein, low in fat and not heavily spiced.
At Judges' Table, Samu, Akseli, Markus were selected as the judges' favorites
At Judges' Table, Arto, Annina, Jani were selected as the judges' least favorites
 WINNER: Markus (Sesame Roasted Sea Trout, Herb Yogurt Raita and Humus)
 ELIMINATED: Jani (Fresh Pasta Tomato Lasagne)
Elimination Challenge Prize: The top three get a private viewing of the match in the skybox.
Guest Judges: Eeva-Liisa "Eve" Vaittinen, Marko Kauppinen
Original Airdate: 23 February 2011

Episode 6: Classic Drama (Klassista draamaa)
Quickfire Challenge: The chefs draw knives and are split into teams for a "broken telephone" challenge. Arto draws a blank knife which entitles him to be a judge. Each team member only gets 10 minutes of cooking time. The challenge starts with one chef starting a dish and after 10 minutes a whistle is blown and the next chef must continue cooking the dish. The chefs that is waiting to cook is blindfolded. The teams and in the order in which the chefs cook are:
Blue Team
Markus
Samu
Mika
Red Team
Maija
Annina
Akseli
WINNING TEAM: Blue Team (Beef Hereford and Warm Salad)
Elimination Challenge: The chefs draw knives for a classic dish to present to food writer Juha Virkki, restaurant critic and author Tuomas Vimma and Anna magazine editor-in-chief Hanna Jensen. The chefs must recreate the classic while preserving its food culture history. The chefs are given 2 hours cooking time to complete the challenge.
Akseli: Sole Meuniére
Annina: Bouillabaisse
Arto: Lobster Thermidor
Maija: Beef Wellington
Markus: Liver A L’Anglaise
Mika: Pike-Perch Walewska
Samu: Tournedos Rossini
At Judges' Table, Maija, Samu and Akseli were selected as the judges' favorites
At Judges' Table, Arto, Annina and Markus were selected as the judges' least favorites
 WINNER: Samu
 ELIMINATED: Arto
Guest Judges: Juha Virkki
Original Airdate: 2 March 2011

Episode 7: Restaurant Wars (Ravintolasota)
Quickfire Challenge: None
Elimination Challenge: For Restaurant Wars, the chefs draw knives and Maija and Samu get to be team leaders and select their team members. Each team gets €2,000 to shop at K-citymarket.
Lemström: (Samu, Akseli, Markus)
First Course: Smoked and Braised Salmon or Roasted Beetroot, Poached Egg and Heidi Cheese
Second Course: Elk Topside, Beef Shoulder and Bean Ragout or Vaasa Wild Whitefish, Miso Vegetables in Ginger Butter Sauce
Third Course: Chocolate Ganache, Lemongrass and Salted Peanut Ice Cream or Lime Posset
Ravintola M.M.M.: (Maija, Mika, Annina)
Amuse Bouche: Freshwater Whitefish Roe, Smetana and Potato Crêpe
First Course: Poached Pike-Perch, Pea Purée and Malt Bread
Second Course: Reindeer Fillet, Brown Mushroom Sauce, Potato Fondant, Parsnip Purée and Roasted Root Vegetables
Third Course: Cloudberry Parfait, Sabayon Sauce and Blueberry Sorbet
At Judges' Table, Team Ravintola M.M.M. was selected as the judges' favorites
At Judges' Table, Team Lemström was selected as the judges' least favourites
WINNER: Team Ravintola M.M.M.
ELIMINATED: Markus
Guest Judges: Olli Vuori
Original Airdate: 9 March 2011

Episode 8: Champagne and Small Surprises (Sampanjaa ja pikku yllätyksiä)
Quickfire Challenge: The chefs are given 20 minutes to create a cocktail.
WINNER: Annina ("Blueberry Dream": Vanila Blueberry Cocktail with Champagne Foam)
Elimination Challenge: The chefs must prepare two savoury dishes and one sweet dish for a fashion show cocktail party for about 50 guests. The dishes must also match Lanson Champagne Brut Black Label.
At Judges' Table, Annina and Akseli were selected as the judges' favorites
At Judges' Table, Mika and Maija were selected as the judges' least favorites
 WINNER: Akseli (Hereford Carpaccio; Salmon Sashimi; Strawberry Mascarpone Macaroon)
 ELIMINATED: Maija (Salmon in Filo; Marinated Ox Tartare; Sesame "Lehikäinen")
Guest Judges: Niko Autti, Essi Avellan
Original Airdate: 16 March 2011

Episode 9: The Steel Hardens in the Fire (Tulessa teräskin karaistuu)
Quickfire Challenge: The chefs go to Porvoo to Kannonnokka and must prepare lunch for the hunters in  hours. The chef draw knives to see which game meat goes to whom:
Annina: Duck
Mika: Willow Grouse
Samu: Pheasant
Akseli: Grey Partridge
WINNER: Mika (Roasted Willow Grouse Breast and Jerusalem Artichoke Ragout)
Elimination Challenge: Back in the Top Chef Kitchen, The chefs must prepare a meal in two hours from the hunters' catch. Mika, as Elimination Challenge winner, gets to choose first. The others choose in the order from best to worst in the Elimination Challenge.
Mika: Elk Fillet
Samu: Wild Boar Fillet
Akseli: Wild Boar Kassler
Annina: Elk Topside
At Judges' Table, Akseli and Samu were selected as the judges' favorites
At Judges' Table, Annina and Mika were selected as the judges' least favorites
WINNER: Samu (Wild Boar Fillet, Pea Purée in Cherry Plum Sauce)
ELIMINATED: Annina (Elk Topside, Puikula Potato Purée, Shallots and Star Anise Jus) and Mika (Elk Fillet, Apple and Wine Sauce, Potato and Celery Dauphines, Garlic Rosemary Purée)
Guest Judge: Pekka Terävä
Original Airdate: 23 March 2011

Episode 10: Finale (Suomen Top Chef -finaali)
Final Challenge: The finalists must prepare a three course meal for six. Akseli is assisted by former competitor Jussi and Samu is assisted by former competitor Markus. After serving the third course, the finalists are given an extra 15 minutes to prepare a petifour. The final menus for each chef are:
Akseli:
1st Course: Seared Scallops with Fennel Risotto and Fennel Sauce
2nd Course: Lamb Two Ways, Lentil Ragout, Dark Garlic Sauce and Potato Gnocche
3rd Course: Apple Lehikäinen and Oven Baked Apple Ice Cream
Petifour: Tramisu
Samu:
1st Course: Juniper Berry Roasted Arctic Char, Smoked Beetroot Purée and FIsh Roe
2nd Course: Reindeer Fillet, Buckwheat and Root Vegetable Ragout, Cep Brick and Dark Fig Sauce
3rd Course: Caramalised Peanut Cake, Poppy Seen Ice Cream, Mangos and Raspberries
Petifour: Dark Chocolate Covered White Chocolate and Almond Crocant and Mango
TOP CHEF: Akseli
RUNNER-UP: Samu
Original Airdate: 30 March 2011

References

External links
 
 

Finnish reality television series
Top Chef
2011 Finnish television series debuts
2010s Finnish television series
Sub (TV channel) original programming
Finnish television series based on American television series
Finnish non-fiction television series